The Ramadan Offensive refers to the attacks mounted by insurgents in Iraq during the holy Muslim month of Ramadan in 2006, three years after the original Ramadan Offensive.

Among the targets were U.S., Iraqi and other Coalition military targets, but many civilians were also killed by death squads. Most of the civilian killings was conducted by the Mahdi Army who were seeking to purge the Sunni population of Baghdad. The offensive coincided with a Coalition operation called Together Forward which was to significantly reduce the violence in Baghdad which had seen a sharp uprise since the mid-February 2006 bombing of the Askariya Mosque, a major Shia Muslim shrine, in Samarra. However, the operation failed. Moreover, the insurgents managed take control of more than 80 percent of Baghdad. Also insurgents made huge gains in the western Al Anbar and southern Babil province, forcing Coalition and Iraqi security forces from many towns and cities. This period also saw the battle of Amarah, during which rogue Mahdi Army fighters fought with the police, who were members of the Badr Organisation, for control of the southern city of Amarah.

References 

Military operations of the Iraq War
Military operations of the Iraq War involving the United States
Military operations of the Iraq War involving Iraq
2006 in Iraq
Iraqi insurgency (2003–2011)
Ramadan
September 2006 events in Iraq
October 2006 events in Iraq